The Assembly of Qom Seminary Scholars and Researchers (also Association of Researchers and Teachers of Qom) is an association of Shia Islamic clerics in Iran's religious capital of Qom.

International notice
The Assembly became more widely known outside of Iran after its criticism of the 12 June 2009 Iranian presidential election. The group criticized the election vote counting system and the Iranian Guardian Council in a statement saying the Council no longer had the "right to judge in this case as some of its members have lost their impartial image in the eyes of the public." The Assembly also released a joint statement demanding new elections as well a statement condemning the state-sponsored detention and killing of anti-Mahmoud Ahmadinejad protesters.

See also
Seyed Hossein Mousavi Tabrizi
Iranian reform movement

References

External links
 Official website

Shia organizations
Reformist political groups in Iran
Iranian clerical political groups
Qom Seminary